TERF1-interacting nuclear factor 2 is a protein that in humans is encoded by the TINF2 gene. TINF2 is a component of the shelterin protein complex found at the end of telomeres.

Interactions 

TINF2 has been shown to interact with ACD, POT1 and TERF1.

References

Further reading

External links 
  GeneReviews/NCBI/NIH/UW entry on Dyskeratosis Congenita
 PDBe-KB provides an overview of all the structure information available in the PDB for Human TERF1-interacting nuclear factor 2 (TINF2)

Telomere-related proteins